César R. Miranda Rodríguez (born in Coamo, Puerto Rico), is an attorney and former Secretary of Justice of Puerto Rico. Miranda was formerly Vice President of the Puerto Rico Telephone Company and Chief of Staff for governor Sila María Calderón. Miranda substituted for Luis Sánchez Betances after Sánchez Bentances resigned effective December 31, 2013. He holds a bachelor's degree in Business Administration with a concentration in Management and Accounting from the University of Puerto Rico, Río Piedras Campus and a Juris Doctor degree from Rutgers Law School in New Jersey.

See also
 16th Cabinet of Puerto Rico

References

21st-century American politicians
Chiefs of Staff of Puerto Rico
Members of the 16th Cabinet of Puerto Rico
People from Coamo, Puerto Rico
Puerto Rican lawyers
Rutgers School of Law–Camden alumni
Secretaries of Justice of Puerto Rico